Libya ( Putāya) was a satrapy of the Achaemenid Empire, that corresponded to the current region of eastern Libya (Cyrenaica), according to King Darius I of Persia Naqshe Rustam and King Xerxes I of Persia' Daiva inscription. It is also mentioned as being part of the 6th district by Herodotus, which also included Cyrene, a Greek colony in Libya. When King Cambyses II of Persia conquered Egypt, the king of Cyrene, Arcesilaus III, sided with Persia. When he was killed trying to maintain power, Queen Pheretima invited the Persians to take Cyrene. The satrap of Egypt, Aryandes, accepted, sending an army under two Persians to support Pheretime. The expedition lasted nearly a year and resulted in the subjugation of the Libyans; the Persians penetrated as far west as the Euhesperides (Benghazi). A puppet king, Battus IV, was installed, and the current region of eastern Libya (Cyrenaica) was made into a Persian satrapy. It is possible that Cyrene gained independence with the rebellion of Egypt in 404 BCE, but ultimately, Achaemenid control of the region was lost after Alexander's conquests.

See also 
 Libya

References 

Ancient Cyrenaica
Achaemenid satrapies